Julian Vandervelde (born October 7, 1987) is a former American football center . He was drafted by the Eagles in the fifth round of the 2011 NFL Draft. He played college football at Iowa and was a prep at Davenport Central High School in Davenport, Iowa. He began his NFL career playing guard, but was reassigned as a center at the beginning of the 2013 season. He also holds the NFL record for being released 21 times over his career.

References

External links

Philadelphia Eagles bio
Iowa Hawkeyes football bio

1987 births
Living people
Sportspeople from Davenport, Iowa
Players of American football from Iowa
American football centers
Iowa Hawkeyes football players
Philadelphia Eagles players
Tampa Bay Buccaneers players